Žabonosy is a municipality and village in Kolín District in the Central Bohemian Region of the Czech Republic. It has about 200 inhabitants.

Etymology
The name originated either from the combination nosit žáby (literally "to carry frogs", meaning "to sell frogs") or from žabí nosy ("frog noses", which meant that people with frog noses lived here).

Geography
It lies in a flat agricultural landscape of the Central Elbe Table.

History
The first written mention of Žabonosy is from 1352. From 1652 until the establishment of an independent municipality in 1850, Žabonosy was part of the Radim estate and shared its owners.

Sights
The landmark of Žabonosy is the Church of Saint Wenceslaus. It is a Gothic church with a Romanesque core from the 10th century, baroque modified in 1721.

References

External links

Villages in Kolín District